Bruce R. Cutler (born July 29, 1950, Cottonwood Heights, Utah) is an American politician. He was a Republican member of the Utah House of Representatives representing District 44 from January 1, 2015 through December 2018.

Early life and education 
Cutler was born in Cottonwood Heights, Utah. When he was 15 his family moved to the East Millcreek area where he attended Skyline High School. He served as a missionary for the Church of Jesus Christ of Latter-day Saints in the Uruguay-Paraguay mission. He received a BS degree in Computer Science from the University of Utah. He currently lives in Murray, Utah with his wife Kathie and four daughters.

Political career 
In 2014, Cutler defeated John Jackson and Raymond Poole in the Republican convention and won the November 4, 2014 general election against Democratic nominee Christine Passey and Libertarian nominee Bret Black with 4,208 votes (48.5%).

During the 2016 general session Cutler served on the House Education Committee, House Judiciary Committee, and Public Education Appropriations Subcommittee. During the interim he served on the Education Interim Committee and the Judiciary Interim Committee.

2016 sponsored legislation 

In 2016, Cutler did not floor sponsor any bills.

References

External links 
 Official page at the Utah State Legislature
 Profile at Project Vote Smart
 Bruce Cutler at Ballotpedia
 Bruce Cutler Official Website

Living people
Republican Party members of the Utah House of Representatives
University of Utah alumni
People from Cottonwood Heights, Utah
Latter Day Saints from Utah
21st-century American politicians
1950 births